Joeri Dequevy (born 27 April 1988) is a Belgian footballer who plays as a winger for Houtvenne in the Belgian Division 2, on loan from Westerlo.

Career

Dequevy started his professional career at K.S.V. Roeselare. He played 68 matches in the Belgian First Division scoring 6 goals.

For its First Division campaign, Lierse announced the signing of Dequevy on 27 June 2010. He signed a three-year contract. A move to Standard Liège fell through prior to his move to Lierse.

On 13 August 2012, Dequevy left Lierse for Belgian Second Division side Sint-Truiden.

In July 2015, Dequevy moved to Royal Antwerp in the Belgian Second Division for an undisclosed fee. He made 64 league appearances during his time there, scoring eight goals.

In January 2018, Dequevy moved to Oud-Heverlee Leuven. He made 32 league appearances for the club, scoring three goals.

In July 2019, it was announced that Dequevy had signed a two-year contract with RWDM with an option of an additional year. He made his debut for the club on 31 August in the starting lineup of a 0–2 home loss to Dender, before being substituted in the 72nd minute.

References

External links

Belgian footballers
1988 births
Living people
K.S.V. Roeselare players
Lierse S.K. players
Sint-Truidense V.V. players
Royal Antwerp F.C. players
Oud-Heverlee Leuven players
RWDM47 players
K.V.C. Westerlo players
Belgian Pro League players
Challenger Pro League players
Footballers from Brussels
Belgium under-21 international footballers
Association football midfielders
KFC Houtvenne players